= Buļļuciems =

Neighbourhood of Jūrmala, Latvia

Coordinates: 57°00′N 23°55′E

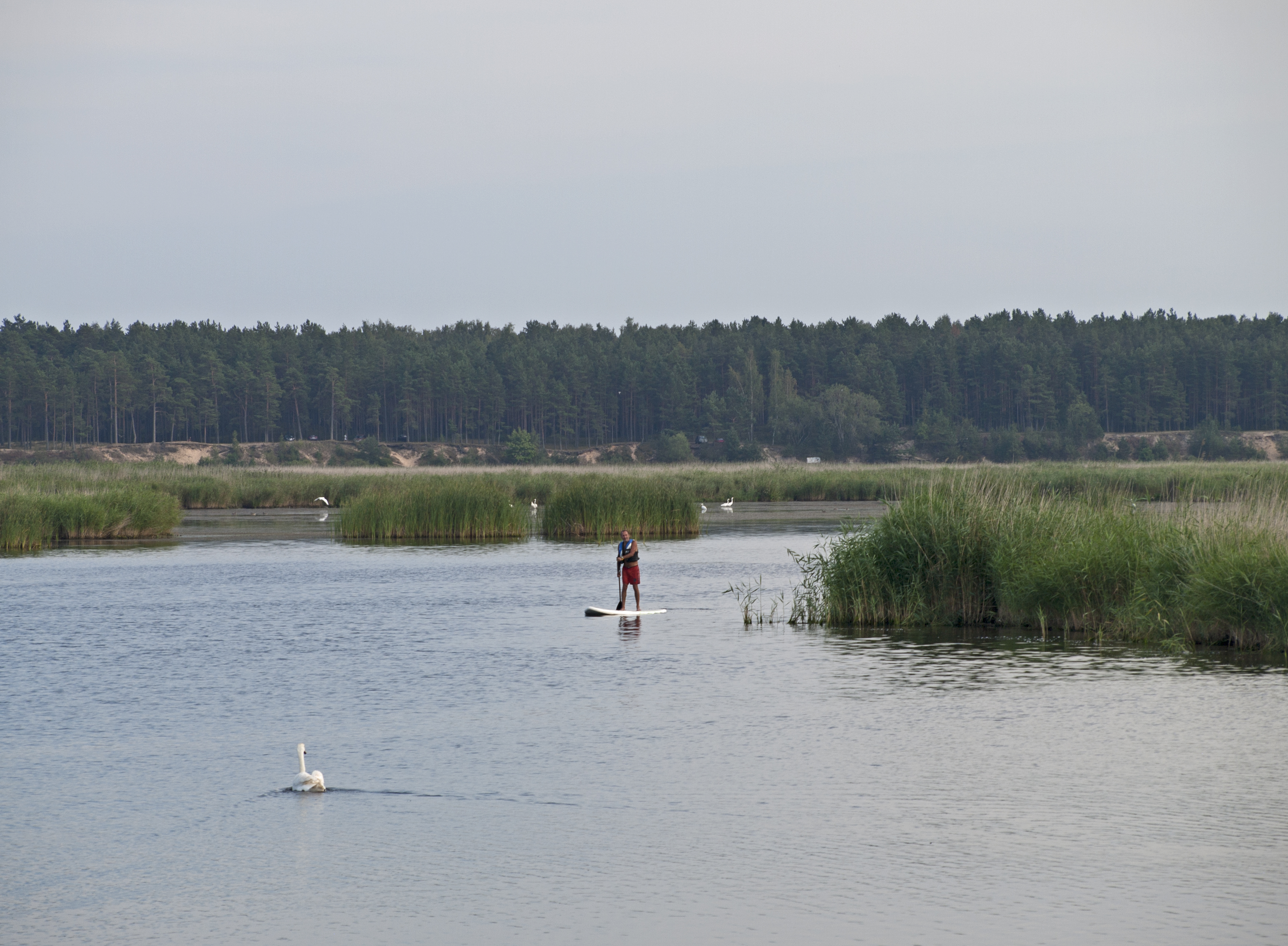
- Lielupe in Bulluciems

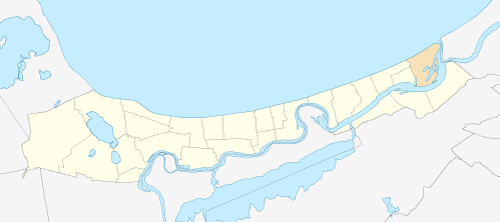
- Location in Jūrmala
- Country: Latvia
- City: Jūrmala

Area
  - Total: 4.6 km^{2} (1.8 sq mi)
- Elevation: 3 m (9.8 ft)

Population (2008)
  - Total: 812
  - Density: 176.5/km^{2} (457/sq mi)

Buļļuciems is a residential area and neighbourhood of the city Jūrmala, Latvia.

The Jurmala open air museum is located in Buļļuciems.
